Land Hadeln is a Samtgemeinde ("collective municipality") in the district of Cuxhaven, in Lower Saxony, Germany. Its seat is in the town Otterndorf. It was formed on 1 January 2011 by the merger of the former Samtgemeinden Hadeln and Sietland. On 1 November 2016 the Samtgemeinde Am Dobrock was merged into Land Hadeln.

The Samtgemeinde Land Hadeln consists of the following municipalities:

 Belum
 Bülkau
 Cadenberge
 Ihlienworth
 Neuenkirchen 
 Neuhaus (Oste)
 Nordleda 
 Oberndorf
 Odisheim 
 Osterbruch 
 Otterndorf
 Steinau 
 Wanna 
 Wingst

References

Cuxhaven (district)
Samtgemeinden in Lower Saxony